The Speaker of the House of Representatives of Liberia is the presiding officer of the legislature. In the current house, the speaker is elected by the house for the term of the legislature, six years. The Speaker may be removed from their position by a two-thirds majority. A Deputy Speaker is also elected, and, in the event of a vacancy in the speakership, serves as Speaker until the election of a replacement, which is to occur within sixty days. The Speaker is also responsible for appointing members to House Committees. This article lists the presiding officers of Liberia's lower house, which has been most often known as the House of Representatives.

List
This is an incomplete list of speakers of the House of Representatives of Liberia:

This is a list of speakers of the Interim National Assembly:

This is a list of presidents of the Interim National Assembly:

This is a list of speakers of the House of Representatives of Liberia:

This is a list of speakers of the Interim National Assembly (ILA):

This is a list of speakers of the Transitional National Assembly (TLA):

This is a list of speakers of the House of Representatives of Liberia:

This is a list of speakers of the National Transitional Legislative Assembly of Liberia (NTLA):

This is a list of speakers of the House of Representatives of Liberia:

References

Politics of Liberia
Liberia
Liberia
Speakers of the House of Representatives of Liberia